Woodie King Jr. (born July 27, 1937) is an American director and producer of stage and screen, as well as the founding director of the New Federal Theatre in New York City.

Early life and education
King was born in Baldwin Springs, Alabama. He graduated high school in 1956 in Detroit, Michigan, United States, and worked at the Ford Motor Company there for three years. He then worked for the City of Detroit as a draftsman.

In 1970, he founded the New Federal Theatre. He earned a B.A. in Self-Determined Studies, with a focus on Theatre and Black Studies, at Lehman College in 1996, and an M.F.A. at Brooklyn College in 1999.

Film and stage direction
King has a long list of credits in film and stage direction and production, including the following:

Co-produced plays
For Colored Girls Who Have Considered Suicide / When the Rainbow Is Enuf by Ntozake Shange
What the Wine Sellers Buy
Reggae
The Taking of Miss Janie, which earned the Drama Critics Circle Award

Awards and recognition
1985: Joseph Jefferson Award nomination for Appear and Show Cause
1988: NAACP Image Award for directing Checkmates at the Inner City Cultural Center
1993: AUDELCO awards for Best Director and Best Play for Robert Johnson: Trick The Devil
1997: Obie Award for Sustained Achievement
2003: Paul Robeson Award
2005: Rosetta LeNoire Award
2011: Induction into American Theater Hall of Fame
2014: Theatre Legend Award, Atlanta Black Theatre Festival

Works

References

External links
 Historymakers Biography
 The New Federal Theater in New Yorksee also inspiring purposes of previous 20th-century African-American theatre projects: Federal Theatre Project, American Negro Theater
 Rosetta LeNoire Award
 Theatre Hall of Fame induction

1937 births
20th-century African-American people
African-American theater directors
American theatre directors
American theatre managers and producers
Brooklyn College alumni
Living people
People from Baldwin County, Alabama